C. pectinata  may refer to:
 Caladenia pectinata, a plant species
 Conta pectinata, a catfish species
 Cotula pectinata, a flowering plant species in the genus Cotula
 Ctenosaura pectinata, the Mexican spiny-tailed iguana, a moderate sized lizard species native to western Mexico
 Cycas pectinata, a plant species in the genus Cycas

Synonyms
 Caesalpinia pectinata, a synonym for Caesalpinia spinosa, the tara, atree species native to Peru

See also
 Pectinata